New York Confidential is a 1955 film noir crime film directed by Russell Rouse starring Broderick Crawford, Richard Conte, Marilyn Maxwell, Anne Bancroft and J. Carrol Naish.

Plot
Charlie Lupo is a gangster who runs the New York branch of a crime syndicate. He is a widower with a worried mother, a grown daughter, Kathy, and a new lover, Iris.

Hit man Nick Magellan of the Chicago mob impresses Lupo, who hires Magellan to be his bodyguard. They form a friendship and Kathy is attracted to Nick, but he resists her advances out of respect for Lupo. 

When a political lobbyist interferes with the syndicate's plans and must be eliminated, Lupo arranges for three men to handle it. But they leave too many clues and themselves have to be taken care of, a task Lupo turns over to Nick.

Nick quickly dispatches two of the targets, but a third flees and, in return for ratting out Lupo to the authorities, manages to arrange a deal for himself.  The gangster hides out while legal negotiations concerning the charge for which Lupo will go to prison go on.

Kathy, having fled her father's home in an attempt to make an independent life, is drawn back in when the police, and reporters, track her down at her job. She shows up at Nick's, clearly intoxicated, to tell him how her life has fallen apart. She throws herself at him but he rejects her. Later, she is killed in a single-car crash. The newspaper headline suggests suicide.

Lupo is devastated; his heart no longer in his work, he decides to cooperate with the authorities. The syndicate determines that he must be eliminated and Nick is ordered to do it.  He does the job but, as a matter of 'insurance', he in turn is killed.

Cast
 Broderick Crawford as Charlie Lupo
 Richard Conte as Nick Magellan
 Marilyn Maxwell as Iris Palmer
 Anne Bancroft as Katherine Lupo
 J. Carrol Naish as Ben Dagajanian
 Onslow Stevens as Johnny Achilles
 Barry Kelley as Robert Frawley
 Mike Mazurki as Arnie Wendler
 Celia Lovsky as Mama Lupo
 Herbert Heyes as James Marshall
 Steven Geray as Morris Franklin
 William 'Bill' Phillips as Whitey
 Tom Powers as District Attorney Rossi
 John Doucette as Shorty

Production
Edward Small bought the rights to the book in 1953. He assigned it over to the team of Clarence Greene and Russell Rouse, who had a six-picture deal with Small. Greene and Rouse wanted George Raft and Paul Muni to star.

Reception

Critical response
The staff at Variety magazine praised the cast in their review of the film, "Among crime exposes New York Confidential stacks up as one of the better-made entries, thanks to a well-fashioned story and good performances by a cast of familiar names ... Conte does a topnotch job of making a coldblooded killer seem real and Crawford is good as the chairman of the crime board, as is Marilyn Maxwell as his girl friend. Anne Bancroft, showing continuing progress and talent, scores with a standout performance of Crawford's unhappy daughter."

Modern critic Dennis Schwartz was disappointed in the film. In 2004 he wrote, "Russell Rouse's New York Confidential is a crime thriller that is a formulaic exposé of the rackets, and is not quite as good as another such film—The Enforcer ... New York Confidential was never exciting, tense or eye-opening. Its narrative was a cliché-driven mob story that was only mildly diverting and even though the performances were energetically delivered, it still tasted like a stale salami sandwich."

See also
List of American films of 1955

References

External links
 
 
 
 
 
 New York Confidential information site and DVD review at DVD Beaver (includes images)
 

1955 films
1955 crime films
American crime films
American black-and-white films
1950s English-language films
Film noir
Films about organized crime in the United States
Films directed by Russell Rouse
Films set in New York City
Warner Bros. films
Films produced by Edward Small
1950s American films